Robert Sanchez is the name of:

Robert M. Sanchez, American train engineer involved in the 2008 Chatsworth train collision
Robert Fortune Sanchez (1934–2012), American archbishop
Robert Sánchez (born 1997), Spanish footballer